Jack McMillan (born 14 January 2000) is an Irish swimmer. He competed in the men's 4 × 200 metre freestyle relay at the 2020 Summer Olympics.

References

External links
 

2000 births
Living people
Irish male swimmers
Irish male freestyle swimmers
Olympic swimmers of Ireland
Swimmers at the 2020 Summer Olympics
Swimmers at the 2022 Commonwealth Games
Commonwealth Games competitors for Northern Ireland
Place of birth missing (living people)
21st-century Irish people